The Boyne River is a river in the Hudson Bay drainage basin in the Central Plains and Pembina Valley Regions of Manitoba, Canada.

Course
It passes to the north and east of the community of Rathwell, as it heads south under Manitoba Highway 2. The river turns southeast into the Rural Municipality of Dufferin in Pembina Valley Region, and reaches Stephenfield Lake, where it takes in the right tributary Roseisle Creek. Stephenfield Provincial Recreation Park is located on the lake. The Morris River flows via the Red River of the North and eventually the Nelson River to Hudson Bay.

Municipalities
Rural Municipality of Macdonald
Carman
Rural Municipality of Dufferin
Rural Municipality of Norfolk Treherne

Tributaries
Roseisle Creek (right)

See also
List of rivers of Manitoba

References

Rivers of Manitoba
Central Plains Region, Manitoba
Tributaries of Hudson Bay